The 1970–71 New York Nets season was the fourth season of the franchise. On January 6, 1971, during a game versus the Memphis Pros, referee Andy Hershock suffered a heart attack, later dying in the medical office at Island Garden. The game was later restarted, with the Nets winning 110–101. Two months later, they played the Kentucky Colonels in a doubleheader benefit game for Hershock.

This was Rick Barry's first season with the Nets. Barry averaged 29.4 points per game.

Roster

Final standings

Eastern Division

Playoffs
Eastern Division Semifinals vs. Virginia Squires

Nets lose series, 4–2

References

External links
1970 draft picks

New York Nets season
New Jersey Nets seasons
New York Nets
New York Nets
Sports in Hempstead, New York